Terellia is a genus of tephritid  or fruit flies in the family Tephritidae.

Species
Subgenus Cerajocera Rondani, 1856
Terellia armeniaca (Korneyev, 1985)
Terellia ceratocera Hendel, 1913)
Terellia clarissima Korneyev, 1987
Terellia cyanoides Korneyev, 2003
Terellia cynarae Rondani, 1870
Terellia euura (Hering, 1942)
Terellia gynaecochroma Hering, 1937
Terellia maculicauda (Chen, 1938)
Terellia nigronota (Korneyev, 1985)
Terellia occidentalis (Snow, 1894)
Terellia palposa (Loew, 1862)
Terellia plagiata (Dahlbom, 1850)
Terellia rhapontici Merz, 1990
Terellia setifera Hendel, 1927
Terellia tussilaginis (Fabricius, 1775)
Subgenus Terellia Robineau-Desvoidy, 1830
Terellia amberboae Korneyev & Merz, 1996
Terellia apicalis (Chen, 1938)
Terellia blanda (Richter, 1975)
Terellia bushi Korneyev, 2006
Terellia caerulea (Hering, 1939)
Terellia colon (Meigen, 1826)
Terellia deserta Korneyev, 1985
Terellia dubia Korneyev, 1985
Terellia ermolenkoi Korneyev, 1985
Terellia fuscicornis (Loew, 1844)
Terellia korneyevorum Mohamadzade & Nozari, 2011
Terellia latigenalis Hering, 1942
Terellia longicauda (Meigen, 1838)
Terellia luteola (Wiedemann, 1830)
Terellia matrix Korneyev, 1988
Terellia megalopyge (Hering, 1936)
Terellia montana Korneyev, 2006
Terellia nigripalpis Hendel, 1927
Terellia oasis Hering, 1938
Terellia odontolophi Korneyev, 1993
Terellia orheana Korneyev, 1990
Terellia oriunda (Hering, 1941)
Terellia popovi Korneyev, 1985
Terellia pseudovirens (Hering, 1940)
Terellia quadratula (Loew, 1869)
Terellia ruficauda (Fabricius, 1794)
Terellia sabroskyi Freidberg, 1982
Terellia sarolensis (Agarwal & Kapoor, 1985)
Terellia serratulae (Linnaeus, 1758)
Terellia tarbinskiorum Korneyev, 2006
Terellia tribulicola (Senior-White, 1922)
Terellia tristicta (Hering, 1956)
Terellia uncinata White, 1989
Terellia vectensis (Collin, 1937)
Terellia vicina (Chen, 1938)
Terellia vilis (Hering, 1961)
Terellia virens (Loew, 1846) - Green Knapweed Clearwing Fly
Terellia virpana Dirlbek, 1980
Terellia volgensis Basov & Tolstoguzova, 1995
Terellia whitei Korneyev & Mohamadzade Namin, 2013
Terellia winthemi (Meigen, 1826)
Terellia zerovae Korneyev, 1985

Terellia ruficauda feeds on Canada thistle has been reported to be the most effective biological control agent for that plant. Its larvae parasitize the seed heads of the plant feeding solely upon fertile seed heads.

See also
 List of Terellia species

References

Tephritinae
Diptera of Europe
Tephritidae genera
Taxa named by Jean-Baptiste Robineau-Desvoidy